A list of members of the Løgting from 2004 to 2008. The Løgting had 32 members this period. The members were elected on 30 April 2002.

Regular members

References

External links
Valgresultat 2002 from Útvarp Føroya

 2002
2002 in the Faroe Islands
2003 in the Faroe Islands
2004 in the Faroe Islands
2002–2004